Kozmerice is a small settlement on the right bank of the Soča River in the Municipality of Tolmin in the Littoral region of Slovenia.

References

External links
Kozmerice on Geopedia

Populated places in the Municipality of Tolmin